The 2011 Against All Odds was a professional wrestling pay-per-view (PPV) event produced by Total Nonstop Action Wrestling (TNA), which took place on February 13, 2011 at Impact Zone in Universal Studios Florida. It was the seventh annual Against All Odds event.

In October 2017, with the launch of the Global Wrestling Network, the event became available to stream on demand.

Storylines

Against All Odds featured nine professional wrestling matches that involved different wrestlers from pre-existing scripted feuds and storylines. Wrestlers portrayed villains, heroes, or less distinguishable characters in the scripted events that built tension and culminated in a wrestling match or series of matches.

Results

Tournament bracket

See also
2011 in professional wrestling

References

External links
Against All Odds Website
TNA Official website
Against All Odds Indemand

Impact Wrestling Against All Odds
2011 in professional wrestling in Florida
Professional wrestling shows in Orlando, Florida
February 2011 events in the United States
2011 Total Nonstop Action Wrestling pay-per-view events